Roberto Bussinello (4 October 1927 in Pistoia – 24 August 1999 in Vicenza) was a racing driver from Italy. 

He participated in three Formula One World Championship Grands Prix, debuting on 10 September 1961. He scored no championship points. He also participated in several non-Championship Formula One races.

Bussinello travelled to Australia in 1964 for a production car race at the Sandown Park circuit in Melbourne. Teaming with Australian driver Ralph Sachs in an Alec Mildren Racing Alfa Romeo Giulia TI Super, Bussinello would win the 1964 Sandown 6 Hour International. The race was the forerunner of what would become the Sandown 500.

Career record

Complete Formula One World Championship results
(key)

Complete British Saloon Car Championship results
(key) (Races in bold indicate pole position; races in italics indicate fastest lap.)

References

1927 births
1999 deaths
People from Pistoia
Italian racing drivers
Italian Formula One drivers
24 Hours of Le Mans drivers
De Tomaso Formula One drivers
Scuderia Centro Sud Formula One drivers
World Sportscar Championship drivers
Sportspeople from the Province of Pistoia